Marian Gabriel (died 2011) is an Indian athlete. He is a triple Asian Games medalist.

References

Athletes (track and field) at the 1951 Asian Games
Athletes (track and field) at the 1954 Asian Games
Asian Games silver medalists for India
Asian Games bronze medalists for India
Asian Games medalists in athletics (track and field)
Medalists at the 1951 Asian Games
Medalists at the 1954 Asian Games
Indian male sprinters
Year of birth missing 
2011 deaths